

2016 

On 13 May 2016 a state of emergency was declared in Venezuela by President Nicolás Maduro. The details of this emergency condition were not explained by Maduro but he mentioned conspiracy within the country and from an OPEC country and the United States to overthrow the Caracas government. The last state of emergency occurred in 2015 due to issues near the Colombian border, resulting in the suspension of constitutional guarantees and the Venezuela–Colombia migrant crisis.

Rationale 
Maduro accused the United States of fomenting a hidden coup against his government. On May 13, Friday night, state television broadcast statements by Maduro saying: "Washington is activating measures at the request of Venezuela’s fascist right, who are emboldened by the coup in Brazil." According to Maduro's opinion, the impeachment process against Brazilian president Dilma Rousseff is a sign that shows he was the next one. In a meeting with the Council of Ministers Maduro stated that the state of emergency decree is directed against "oligarchical parasites and speculators".

Responses 
The opposition-dominated National Assembly started a process to recall Maduro as president, citing as motives bad conditions such as food and medicine shortages, power cuts, looting and increasing of inflation rate, along with complaints of corruption, drug trafficking and human rights violations. Tomás Guanipa, opposition lawmaker, said: "Today Maduro has again violated the constitution. Why? Because he is scared of being recalled."

In the lead up to the declaration, United States intelligence officials told reporters that they were worried about an economic and political crisis in Venezuela, predicting that Maduro would not complete his presidency. They added: "You can hear the ice cracking. You know there's a crisis coming."

See also 

2014–16 Venezuelan protests
Crisis in Venezuela
Timeline of the 2016 Venezuelan protests

References

States of emergency
Crisis in Venezuela
Emergency laws
Political history of Venezuela